Tonstad is the administrative centre of the municipality of Sirdal in Agder county, Norway. The village is located at the northern end of the lake Sirdalsvatnet in the Sirdalen valley.

Tonstad Hydroelectric Power Station and the Tonstad ski center are both located in and around this village. The Tonstad Church is also located in the village.

The village of Tonstad was the administrative center of the old municipality of Tonstad from 1905 until its dissolution in 1960. In 1960, it became the part of Sirdal, and it continued to be the administrative center of that new municipality.

Name
The municipality of Tonstad was named after the old Tonstad farm (Old Norse: Þornýjarstaðir ), since the Tonstad Church is located there. The first element of the name comes from the female name Tone (Old Norse: Þorný) and the last element is staðir which means "homestead" or "farm".

References

External links

Weather information for Tonstad 
Sirdolen.no 

Villages in Agder
Sirdal